Breaking of the Chains (1995) is an outdoor public art sculpture by Mel Edwards, installed along San Diego's Martin Luther King Jr. Promenade, in the U.S. state of California.

The work is a large and tall metal sculpture that serves as a tribute to Martin Luther King Jr. and symbolizes the breaking the chains of discrimination. At the base of the sculpture is a plaque with a quote by Martin Luther King, reading, "Along the way of life, someone must have the sense enough, and morality enough to cut off the chain of hate. This can only be done by projecting the ethic of love to the center of our lives."

See also

 1995 in art

References

1995 establishments in California
1995 sculptures
Memorials to Martin Luther King Jr.
Monuments and memorials in California
Outdoor sculptures in San Diego